Mohalla Jam-e-Shifa is located in Peshawar, Khyber Pakhtunkhwa, Pakistan. It is a prominent street of Mattani, The name is Derived from a clinic named Jam-e-Shifa of Doctor Jamshed Khan.

History 
There was a small lake in the Mohalla Jam-e-shifa, which about 10 years ago was demolished and a Masjid and a Madrasa were constructed. The street had few houses at start but with the start of 21st century it got two markets and most of the houses were refurnished.

Importance 
It is situated in the center of Mattani, so it is a link to many other streets, to other villages, to Mattani's main market named as ADDA and to Peshawar City

References

Populated places in Peshawar District